Euflávio Odilon Ribeiro Airport  is the airport serving Pimenta Bueno, Brazil.

History
The airport was inaugurated on December 21, 2012.

Airlines and destinations

Access

See also

List of airports in Brazil

References

External links

Airports in Rondônia
Airports established in 2012